The 1929 Dayton Triangles season was their tenth and final season in the league before the franchise was sold and moved to Brooklyn. The team did not improve on their previous output of 0–7, losing all six games they played bringing their losing streak up to 17 games. Hence, they were winless for two consecutive seasons. This feat would be duplicated by the 1943 and 1944 Chicago Cardinals; however, the NFL does not consider that to be the longest losing streak, as the Cardinals combined with the Pittsburgh Steelers in the 1944 season. As a traveling team, they played all six games on the road, finishing twelfth in the league. The franchise was sold and relocated to Brooklyn after the season, losing its final seventeen games spanning three seasons. During this stretch, the team was outscored 301–22. With the team's ceasing operations in Dayton, the NFL lost is longest-lasting traveling team (1920–1929), and the final traveling team until the Dallas Texans in 1952, though the Texans themselves descended from the Triangles franchise through numerous transactions over the years.

The Dayton Triangles were limited to only seven points throughout the entire season. This was the final team in NFL history to score under ten points in a season. This dubious feat had been accomplished nineteen times prior to this season's Dayton Triangle's performance. This was the Triangle's third time (1925, 1928, 1929) to record a single-digit season scoring output, tying the Louisville Brecks (1921, 1923, 1926) for this dubious record.

They were coached by Faye Abbott, his second and final season of coaching. Abbott had previously played for the Triangles; between coaching and playing, he participated in 70 of the Triangles' 77 games as a franchise. The franchise was winless under Abbott's head coaching. With the franchise relocating, Abbott would be the Triangles' fourth and final head coach.

Their lone touchdown and scoring play of the season was scored on a 30-yard fumble recovery by Left Guard Al Graham (followed by a Pat Duffy extra-point kick) against the Frankford Yellowjackets.

Schedule

Standings

References

Dayton Triangles seasons
Dayton Triangles
Dayton Tri
National Football League winless seasons